The Hastings Star Gazette was an American, English language newspaper in Hastings, Dakota County, Minnesota.  The Hastings Gazette started publication in 1857. The Hastings Star began publishing as a competitive newspaper in 1977. It was under the ownership of Mike O'Connor and Arlin Albright (later sold to Forum Communications). The Hastings Star purchased the Hastings Gazette in 1984 and the publication became known as the Hastings Star Gazette. The paper was published weekly on Thursday and circulation of 3,618 in 2019.

The Star Gazette was a member of the Minnesota Newspaper Association. In 2014, the newspaper won association awards for General Excellence, Best Use of Photography and Typography and Design.

Amid large revenue losses associated with the COVID-19 pandemic, on May 7, 2020, Forum Publications ceased publication of the newspaper.

History
The Hastings Star Gazette traced its roots back to the early years of Minnesota, which became a state in 1858.  The newspaper was preceded by four newspapers in Hastings:
 The Hastings Star (1977-1981)
 The Hastings Gazette (1866-1981)
 The Hastings Conserver  (1863-1866)
 The Hastings independent (1857-1866)

References

See also
List of newspapers in Minnesota

Defunct newspapers published in Minnesota
Hastings, Minnesota
1857 establishments in Minnesota Territory
2020 disestablishments in Minnesota
Publications disestablished in 2020
Publications established in 1857